Events in the year 1958 in Spain.

Incumbents
Caudillo: Francisco Franco

Births
13 January – Juan Pedro de Miguel, handball player (died 2016)
14 February – Francisco Javier López Peña, Basque separatist (died 2013)
27 February – Juan Antonio March Pujol, diplomat
12 October – David Amaral Rodríguez.
30 October – Quique Hernández.
8 December – Manuel Gómez Pereira.

Deaths
June 9 - Manuel Luna.
November 18 - Francisco Pagazaurtundúa.

See also
 List of Spanish films of 1958

References

 
Years of the 20th century in Spain
1950s in Spain
Spain
Spain